Halos for Heros, Dirt for the Dead is the debut EP by American rock band A Day to Remember.

Recording and release
The EP was recorded at Skylab Recording Studios in Gainesville, Florida. The material on the EP was written in vocalist Jeremy McKinnon's garage, and was recorded all in one day live-in-studio. Samples of tracks titled "Camo", "Second Guess" and "Heartless" were posted online around the same time.

The band self-released the EP, it was limited to 2,000 copies. The EP helped the band get signed to Indianola. In 2012, guitarist Neil Westfall said the band had no plans to re-release the EP. A music video for "Breathe Hope in Me" was directed by Daniel Harrison and filmed during the band's high school days. The video was leaked onto the Internet in April 2011.

Track listing
All tracks are written by A Day to Remember.

Personnel
Tom Denney – lead guitar
 Bobby Scruggs – drums
Jeremy McKinnon – vocals                                   
Neil Westfall – rhythm guitar
Joshua Woodard – bass

References

A Day to Remember EPs
2004 debut EPs
Self-released EPs